Sandra Speichert (born  22 January 1971) is a German actress. She performed in more than forty films since 1992, along with a number of theatrical performances.

Selected filmography

Awards
 Prix Romy Schneider, Paris, France (1994) 
 United Cinemas International, Düsseldorf, Germany (1998)

References

External links
 
 

1971 births
Living people
German film actresses
German television actresses
German stage actresses
Actors from Basel-Stadt
20th-century German actresses
21st-century German actresses
Cours Florent alumni